Oxford Female Institute is a registered historic building in Oxford, Ohio, listed in the National Register of Historic Places in 1976. The Oxford Female Institute was affiliated with the Presbyterian Church, and its first president was John Witherspoon Scott. His second daughter Caroline Scott, an Oxford Institute graduate, married Benjamin Harrison and became First Lady after his election as President of the United States in 1888.

The college was later known as Oxford College and Oxford College for Women. Miami University took over ownership of the school in 1928 and absorbed its students. Miami used the building, commonly known as "Ox College", as a women's residence hall for more than sixty years. 

In 2001, Miami leased the building to the Oxford Community Arts Center for the community of Oxford.

Notes

External links
Oxford Community Arts Center website

School buildings on the National Register of Historic Places in Ohio
Buildings and structures in Butler County, Ohio
National Register of Historic Places in Butler County, Ohio
Miami University
Defunct private universities and colleges in Ohio
Female seminaries in the United States
Former women's universities and colleges in the United States
History of women in Ohio